Battle Group is a 1986 computer wargame designed by Gary Grigsby and published by Strategic Simulations. It is a follow-up to Grigsby's earlier Kampfgruppe.

Gameplay
Battle Group is a computer wargame that simulates the Western Front of World War II at the platoon scale, between 1943 and 1945. It features an editor that allows players to create their own combat scenarios.

Development
Battle Group was designed by Gary Grigsby and published by Strategic Simulations Inc. (SSI). It is a follow-up to Grigsby's game Kampfgruppe, and reuses that title's game engine and mechanics. Battle Group was released in 1986, the same year Grigsby and SSI launched Warship.

Reception

Jay Selover reviewed the game for Computer Gaming World, and stated that "Just as the title of the game is a translation of the earlier title, the game itself is basically a translation. The system, mechanics, and design are straight from Kampfgruppe; and here even the "feel" of the combat is still very World War II-ish." Commodore Microcomputers named Battle Group one of the top computer wargames of 1986.

In his 1989 survey of computer wargames, J. L. Miller of Computer Play offered the game a middling score.

Reviews
Computer Gaming World - November 1991

References

External links

Review in Ahoy!

1986 video games
Apple II games
Commodore 64 games
Computer wargames
Strategic Simulations games
Turn-based strategy video games
Video games about Nazi Germany
Video games developed in the United States
Video games set in Europe
World War II video games